These are modes of energy production, energy storage, or energy conservation, listed alphabetically. Note that not all sources are accepted as legitimate or have been proven to be tappable.

Atomic energy
Banki turbine
Battery (electricity)
Bioalcohol
Biodiesel
Biodiesel production
Biofuel
Biogas
Biomass
Bio-nano generator
Bitumen
Breeder reactor
Bubble fusion – a nuclear fusion reaction hypothesized to occur during sonoluminescence, an extreme form of acoustic cavitation.
Coal
Coal mining
Cold fusion
Combustion
Compound turbine – two axle, steam
Compressed air energy storage
Concentrated solar power
Deep lake water cooling
Diesel
Dyson sphere
Electrical grid
Energy tower
External combustion engine

Fischer–Tropsch process
Flywheel (storage)
Fossil fuel
Fossil-fuel power station
Francis turbine
Fuel – a substance used as a source of energy, usually by the heat produced in combustion
Fuel cell
Fuel efficiency
Fusion power
Gas turbine
Gasohol
Geothermal exchange heat pump
Geothermal heating
Geothermal power
Grid energy storage
High-altitude wind power – Energy can be captured from the wind by kites, aerostats, airfoil matrices, balloons, bladed turbines, kytoon, tethered gliders sailplanes
Hydroelectricity
Hydrogen economy
Hydrogen storage, Underground hydrogen storage
Hydropower-Energy from moving water
Implosion
Kaplan turbine
Light crude oil
Liquid fuel
Liquid nitrogen engine
Marine current power
Magnetohydrodynamic, generator, MHD generator or dynamo transforms thermal energy or kinetic energy directly into electricity
Methane clathrate
Methanol
Methanol economy
Natural gas
Natural gas field
Natural gas vehicle
Nuclear energy – energy in the nucleus or core of atoms
Nuclear fusion
Nuclear reactor
Nuclear reprocessing
Oil drilling
Oil platform
Oil refinery
Oil shale
Oil well
Osmotic power – or salinity gradient power – is the energy available from the difference in the salt concentration between seawater and river water.
OTEC – ocean thermal energy conversion
Oxidation
Peat
Perpetuum Motion
Petroleum
Photovoltaics
Piezoelectricity
Pneumatics – compressed air
Products based on refined oil
Propellant
Pumped-storage hydroelectricity
Pyrolysis
Renewable energy
Savonius wind turbine – wind
Small hydro

Solar box cooker
Solar cell
Solar chimney
Solar panel
Solar energy
Solar power satellite
Solar thermal energy
Solar updraft tower – large version of the solar chimney concept
Solar water heating
Solid fuel
Sonoluminescence – the emission of short bursts of light from imploding bubbles in a liquid when excited by sound.
SSTAR – small, sealed, transportable, autonomous reactor
Steam turbine
Stirling engine
Straight vegetable oil
Stranded gas reserve
Sulfur-iodine cycle
Sustainable design
Synfuel
Syngas
Tar sands
Tesla turbine
Thermal depolymerization
Thermal power station
Thermo-electric power
Thorium
Tidal power
Transmutation
Turgo turbine – impulse water turbine designed for medium head applications
Tyson turbine – for river flow harnessing

UASB
Uranium
Vacuum energy
Vibration energy scavenging
Vortex energy
Water turbine
Wave power
Wind energy
Wind farm
Wind turbine
Wood fuel
Wood gas 
Quark Matter energy
Zero-point energy

References

External links 
 A complete list of different sources of Energy | Energy Physics

Energy sources
Energy-related lists
Sustainable energy